Loch Naver is a loch in the Farr parish in Sutherland in the Highland council area of northern Scotland. It is situated upon the B873 main road. Upon the loch are also the settlements of Kilbreck, Redhackaistelll and Dailmallhart. Additionally Alltnaharra and Achanaes are nearby. Fishing is very popular on Loch Naver and the River Naver.

Geography 
The Loch is nearly 10 kilometres long but only 200–600 metres across depending on Location, Loch Naver stretches out East-West and water flows eastward from the River Mudale and Loch Staonsaid to the River Naver and Loch Hope.

Inflows and outflows 
The Primary inflows of Loch Naver are the River Mudale and the River Vagastie while the primary outflow is the River Naver. Other inflows include:

 Grummore Burn
 Allt Gruama Beag
 Allt a' Choire Bhuidhe
 Allt a' Chnoic Leith
 Allt Ach' a' Chuil
 Allt Ruigh na Sealbhaig
 Allt Creagach
 Kilbreck Burn

Fishing 
Fishing is very common not only in Loch Naver but also in the River Naver, as it is a top place to catch trout. The Stathnaver area is often referred to as one of the best areas for fishing in the country. People wishing to stay in the area have choice with there being a caravan park on the Loch as well as lodges in Alltnaharra and Syre.

References 

Lochs of Highland (council area)
Parish of Farr